Higher Institute of Humanistic and Philosophical Studies (ISEHF) has been training Jesuits in preparation for the priesthood since 1978. Since 1997 it has offered to the public degrees in philosophy and education. In 2015 it began offering the Master of Educational Administration and Management.

History
ISEHF is a teaching and research center. It grew out of the school of philosophy (CEPHSI) launched in 1978. A philosophy degree is granted through the Catholic University "Our Lady of the Assumption," and since 2000 the Ministry of Education and Culture has authorized ISEHF to grant the titles Professor of Philosophy, of Ethics, and of Citizenship Education. ISEHF is a member of AUSJAL (Association of Universities Entrusted to the Society of Jesus in Latin America).

See also
 List of Jesuit sites

References  

Jesuit universities and colleges
Universities and colleges in South America
Educational institutions established in 1978
1978 establishments in Paraguay